True Republican was a semi-weekly pro-Republican newspaper published by Boies & Peck in Sycamore, Illinois beginning in 1861 and continued into the late 20th century. It was also known as the Sycamore True Republican.

References

External links 
 Illinois Digital Newspaper Collections: True Republican (1869-1968)

Defunct newspapers published in Illinois
Sycamore, Illinois
1861 establishments in Illinois